The Agricultural Research, Extension, and Education Reform Act of 1998 (P.L. 105-185) was separate legislation that revised and reauthorized federally supported agricultural research, education, and extension programs from June 1998 through May 2002 (historically, these authorities have been part of an omnibus farm policy law enacted every 4 to 6 years).  The 1998 Act built upon reforms that were made in the research title of the farm law in effect at the time, the 1996 farm bill (P.L. 104-127).  Key provisions were new accountability measures for recipients of federal research funds, and a new competitive research grant program called the Initiative for Future Agriculture and Food Systems, for which mandatory funds were authorized (annually appropriated discretionary funds support most of USDA’s research, education and extension programs).  The 1998 law's provisions, as well as new  revisions of research, education, and extension policies, are included in Title VII of the 2002 farm bill (P.L. 107-171).

References 

United States federal agriculture legislation
Acts of the 105th United States Congress